Emericella stella-maris is a fungus. Its ascospores have star-shaped equatorial crests. It was isolated from leaf litter in Tunisia.

See also
Emericella discophora
Emericella filifera
Emericella olivicola

References

Trichocomaceae
Fungi described in 2008